Scrobipalpa gallicella is a moth in the family Gelechiidae. It was described by Constant in 1885. It is found in Spain, southern France and Italy to Hungary, Ukraine and Russia.

The larvae feed on Artemisia caerulescens gallica and Artemisia alba. The larva spins a number of leaves together into a bunch, and mines these out. Pupation takes place outside of the mine. The larvae have a body with red or reddish brown length lines and a darker reddish head.

References

Scrobipalpa
Moths described in 1885